Flowers of Evil is the third studio album and first live album by American hard rock band Mountain. The title track concerns drug abuse in Vietnam.  The first side of the album includes new studio material, while the second  consists of live material recorded on 27 June 1971 at the Fillmore East in New York City. It was released in November 1971 by Windfall.

Track listing

Side 1: Studio
"Flowers of Evil" (West, Pappalardi, David Rea) – 4:53
"King's Chorale" (Pappalardi) – 1:04
"One Last Cold Kiss" (Pappalardi, Collins) – 3:45
"Crossroader" (Pappalardi, Collins) – 4:47
"Pride and Passion" (Pappalardi, Gail Collins Pappalardi) – 7:05

Side 2: Live
1. "Dream Sequence" (medley) – 24:27
Guitar Solo (West) / 
Roll Over Beethoven (Chuck Berry) / 
Dreams of Milk and Honey (West, Pappalardi, John Ventura, Norman Landsberg) / 
Variations (West, Pappalardi, Laing, Steve Knight) / 
Swan Theme (Pappalardi, Collins)
2. "Mississippi Queen" (West, Pappalardi, Laing, Rea) – 3:53

Personnel
 Leslie West – guitar, vocals
 Felix Pappalardi – bass, vocals, production
 Steve Knight – keyboards
 Corky Laing – drums, percussion

Additional personnel
 Bud Prager – executive producer
 Bob d'Orleans – recording engineer
 Judy Szekely – recording engineer
 Beverly Weinstein – art direction
 Gail Collins – artwork
 The Music Agency – graphics

Charts

References

External links 
Mountain - Flowers of Evil (1971) album releases & credits at Discogs.com

Mountain (band) albums
Live at the Fillmore East albums
1971 live albums
Island Records live albums
Sony Records live albums
Windfall Records live albums
Albums produced by Felix Pappalardi
Albums produced by Leslie West
Albums produced by Corky Laing
Albums produced by Steve Knight (musician)
Concept albums